Tor di Quinto is the 18th quartiere of Rome (Italy), identified by the initials Q. XVIII. It belongs to the Municipio XV.

Geography

Boundaries
Northward, the quartiere borders with suburbio Tor di Quinto (S. I) and with the zone Grottarossa (Z. LVI).

Eastward, it borders with the zona Val Melaina (Z. I).

Southward, it borders with the quartiere Parioli (Q. II).

Westward, it borders with the quartiere Flaminio (Q. XV).

References

External links